was a Japanese politician who served as member of the House of Representatives for the Social Democratic Party.

1941 births
2021 deaths
Politicians from Ōita Prefecture
Members of the House of Representatives (Japan)
Social Democratic Party (Japan) politicians
21st-century Japanese politicians